Donata Premeru (born 4 June 1934) is a musicologist, broadcaster, lyricist, journalist, lecturer and historian of Arts.

Biography and career
After graduation at Musicology and History of Arts in Zagreb (Croatia), she did postgraduate studies of Early and Contemporary Music at London University (UK). Donata started as student lecturer and broadcaster at Radio Zagreb and continued as Music Editor of Stereorama programme on Radio Belgrade. In 1965 she was invited to start the Radio Beograd Third Programme (music section), and in 1983 its stereo weekend Music Programme Stereorama.

The composer, writer and artist Dušan Radić (1929-2010) in his book Tragovi balkanske vrleti-vreme-život-muzika (2007) dedicated a whole section (p. 107-114) to Donata Premeru and her broadcast programme Music Matters. For after 20 years of his absence from the musical scene, she interrupted this silence and invited him in her radio programme regarding his 75th birthday on April 10, 2004. In 2016, book Film and Music – Temptations of great composers – based on 14 radio programmes – was published with her guest, Borislav Stojkov.

Other biographical listings
She made numerous appearances on Radio and TV Stations (Zagreb, Belgrade, Novi Sad, BBC, Rome); was a lecturer: Zagreb/Belgrade (Jeunesses musicales) and in Rome, Italy (on Operas and RTV Musical Archives in former Yugoslavia). She is a member of the International Jury Torneo Internazionale di musica (TIM). In 2006 she was chairman of the Jury for Vasilije Mokranjac Piano Music Competition in Novi Sad.

Honours and awards
1965, 1st Prize on Radio Belgrade
1990, The Journalistic Golden Microphone of Radio Belgrade for 25 Years of Highest Achievements in Broadcasting Media given the first time to a Music Editor
2006, Acknowledgement and Diploma from the GitarArt festival as to a professional promoter in 2014.

Published papers and articles
 On Children’s Operas (1997)
 Conversations with Contemporary Composers and Musicians, 2000/2012 /first broadcast on the III program/: Pierre Boulez, Michael Tippett, Peter Pears, Hans Werner Henze, Peter Ruzicka, Peter Maxwell Davies, George Benjamin, Goffredo Petrassi, Ada Gentile, Gloria Coates
 In daily newspapers: Politika, Borba, Naša Borba, Danas
 In magazines: OKO (Zagreb), Il mondo della musica (Rome) & The C.E.J. Newsletter (EU Community of Journalists) – in Italian, New Moment Magazine (London) and TEMPO a Quarterly Review of Modern Music (Cambridge, UK)
 III Programme, Magazine of Radio Belgrade, Projekat, Pozorište (Novi Sad), Reč, Pro Femina, Pro Musica, Continuo, Novi Zvuk/New Sound, Teatron, Muzikologija, Književnost, Književni magazin, Koraci, Muzika klasika
 First Opera Leksikon (Belgrade, 2008) she wrote articles mainly on contemporary operas (Daniel Börtz Marie Antoinette; Zoltán Kodály Háry János; György Ligeti Le grand macabre; Luigi Nono Intolleranza 1960; Emil Petrovič C'est la guerre!; Sándor Szokolay/Federico García Lorca/ Vérnász, Isidora Žebeljan Zora D., Ferenc Erkel Bánk Bán)

Memberships
Union of Yugoslav Composers (from 1976)
Union of European Journalists C.E.J. (from 1989)

References

External links
 Article at Radio Beograd
 Article in Newsound
 Article in Newsound
 Article in Danas
 Brief article in RTS

1934 births
Living people
Croatian musicologists
Croatian journalists
Croatian women journalists
Place of birth missing (living people)